The 1990 Baltimore Orioles season  was a season in American baseball in which the Orioles finished fifth in the American League East with a record of 76 wins and 85 losses.

Offseason
 October 3, 1989: Mark Huismann was released by the Orioles.
 November 2, 1989: Jamie Quirk was released by the Orioles.
 December 5, 1989: Keith Hughes and Cesar Mejia (minors) were traded by the Orioles to the New York Mets for John Mitchell and Joaquin Contreras (minors).
 February 20, 1990: Sam Horn was signed as a free agent by the Orioles.
 February 22, 1990: Danny Boone was signed as a free agent by the Orioles.

Regular season
On May 25, 1990, the Orioles announced that the team would move their spring training home games from Miami Stadium where they had played since 1959 to Bradenton and Sarasota in 1991. When Cleveland announced that they would leave Hi Corbett Field for Florida, Tucson tried to attract the Orioles to move to Arizona.

Ben McDonald became the first Oriole to win his first six major league decisions.

Season standings

Record vs. opponents

Opening Day starters
 Phil Bradley
 Steve Finley
 Sam Horn
 Dave Johnson
 Randy Milligan
 Joe Orsulak
 Billy Ripken
 Cal Ripken Jr.
 Mickey Tettleton
 Craig Worthington

Notable transactions
 June 4, 1990: 1990 Major League Baseball draft
 Mike Mussina was drafted by the Orioles in the first round.
 Scott McClain was drafted by the Orioles in the 22nd round. Player signed June 7, 1990.
 June 5, 1990: Jay Tibbs was traded by the Orioles to the Pittsburgh Pirates for a player to be named later. The Pirates completed the deal by sending Dorn Taylor to the Orioles on September 5.
 July 30, 1990: Phil Bradley was traded by the Orioles to the Chicago White Sox for Ron Kittle.

Roster

Player stats

Batting

Starters by position
Note: Pos = Position; G = Games played; AB = At bats; H = Hits; Avg. = Batting average; HR = Home runs; RBI = Runs Batted In

Other batters
Note: G = Games played; AB = At bats; H = Hits; Avg. = Batting average; HR = Home runs; RBI = Runs batted in

Pitching

Starting pitchers
Note: G = Games pitched; IP = Innings pitched; W = Wins; L = Losses; ERA = Earned run average; SO = Strikeouts

Other pitchers
Note: G = Games pitched; IP = Innings pitched; W = Wins; L = Losses; ERA = Earned run average; SO = Strikeouts

Relief pitchers
Note: G = Games pitched; W = Wins; L = Losses; SV = Saves; ERA = Earned run average; SO = Strikeouts

Farm system

LEAGUE CHAMPIONS: Rochester, Frederick

References

External links
 1990 Baltimore Orioles team at Baseball-Reference
 1990 Baltimore Orioles season at baseball-almanac.com

Baltimore Orioles seasons
Baltimore Orioles season
Baltimore